Viking Wolf (Norwegian: Vikingulven) is a 2022 Norwegian horror and thriller film directed by Stig Svendsen and starring Liv Mjönes, Elli Rhiannon Müller Osborne, Arthur Hakalahti and Sjur Vatne Brean. The movie was primarily filmed in Notodden, Norway.

Plot 
During a Viking raid on a monastery in Normandy in 1050, the raiding party discover a wolf cub behind a locked door which they believed held treasure. As compensation for the absent gold and silver, the vikings take the cub to Norway. By the time the ship reaches the Norwegian coast, all vikings have been killed by the wolf and it escapes into the Norwegian wilderness.

Meanwhile, in the present day Norwegian town of Nybo, 17 year old Thale (Elli Rhiannon Müller Osborne) has recently moved into her new home with her family after her mother Liv (Liv Mjönes) transferred from her former job as a police officer in Oslo, to the local Nybo police force following the death of Thale's father. Thale partially blames her mother for her father's death and doesn't get along well with her stepfather Arthur (Vidar Magnussen). The only person she's still close with and cares for, is her deaf little sister Jenny (Mia Fosshaug Laubacher). While watching a horror movie with her, Thale receives a text from her high school friend Jonas (Sjur Vatne Brean), inviting her for a party in the woods near the bay with the other Nybo youth. Things don't go well at the party and Thale decides to leave early when she spots Jonas talking with Elin (Silje Øksland Krohne), the local mayor's daughter, in the woods by the bay. During their talk, Elin gets attacked by a creature in the dark and is injured. While Jonas backs away in fear, Thale attempts to help Elin, only to get injured herself as the beast slices her shoulder. Elin is dragged screaming into the woods and the local police and paramedics show up to the scene. While Jonas and Thale receive treatment, the police force including Thale's mother Liv and police chief Eilert (Øyvind Brandtzæg) search for Elin, finding only a bloody phone and a big torn-off claw.

The following day all people who attended the party are questioned by the police including Jonas and Thale as key eyewitnesses, however they claim not to know what kind of beast attacked them despite Liv's suspicion that the beast might've been a wolf. In the meantime Elin's mutilated body is found and undergoes an autopsy. The autopsy reveals that a big beast was responsible for the attack, however it could not be determined whether it was a wolf or not. To be sure, the police force calls in the help from an expert from the veterinary college William (Arthur Hakalahti). But before he can arrive, a mysterious one armed man named Lars (Ståle Bjørnhaug) visits the police station and claims to Liv that the beast is a werewolf which he had been tracking his entire life throughout Scandinavia. Liv doesn't believe the man and calls his claims disrespectful against the victim and her family before dismissing him. The man leaves, but not before giving her a silver bullet and telling her it's the only thing that can kill the beast. After the arrival of the vet and his conclusion that the murderous beast could indeed be an unusually large wolf based on the injuries of the victim and claw found on the scene, the victim's mother and mayor of Nybo Tove (Anna Drowak) vows vengeance against the beast and sends out a hunting party to kill it.

While the hunting party under the command of Liv and Eilert search the woods with the help of a tracking dog, Thale begins to have strange dreams and visions as her senses also seem to sharpen. In the meantime, the hunting party locates a headless corpse and determine it to be the beast's work. Liv orders two hunters to stay behind and guard the body as she and the rest of the party press on, following their tracking dog. The group are lead to an abandoned mine and Liv enters it, climbing down the mine she finds the missing head of the body they found earlier. At the same time the beast attacks the two hunters who were left behind near the body, killing them both. The group hear their screams, but before they can react the beast reaches them and kills two more members of the hunting party and seriously wounds Eilert. As Liv is climbing out of the mine, she stumbles upon the beast, now revealed to be a wolf, at the top of the ladder. The wolf lunges at her, causing her to fall down the mineshaft, breaking her wrist. The wolf stalks her as she crawls away, leading to Liv grabbing her gun and shooting the wolf, hitting it multiple times to no avail. Without ammunition, Liv finds herself at the mercy of the wolf, until she remembers the silver bullet which was giving to her by Lars. She loads it into her gun and fires it just as the wolf lunges in to attack her.

Liv and Eilert are taken to the hospital where Liv gets a cast for her wrist and Eilert is revealed to be in a coma. The body of the wolf is examined by William, who reveals to Liv that the lead bullets which she had hit the wolf with had had no impact on the wolf whatsoever, despite hitting the wolf's heart and lungs. It is then revealed that the only fatal injury the wolf sustained, came from the silver bullet she had fired, leading Liv to believe they had indeed encountered a werewolf. Believing the nightmare to be over, mayor Tove gives a media statement alongside Liv, ensuring the city's safety with the demise of the beast. Meanwhile, Thale still experiences the strange occurrences alongside the guilt she feels for not being able to safe Elin. In the night she receives a text from Jonas, inviting her to a viewpoint with him. At the viewpoint, Jonas and Thale are ready to move on from their encounter with the beast upon its demise and share a kiss before they are interrupted by a phone call from Jonas' father. While on the phone, the full moon transforms Thale into a more animalistic version of herself with sharp teeth and animal like instincts. Before she can warn Jonas, she loses control and kills him.

After the discovery of Jonas' remains, the coroner concludes that the injuries he sustained are similar to those of Elin albeit by a smaller animal. This discovery prompts Liv to visit Lars who reveals to her that once a human has been transformed into a wolf, they no longer have any humanity left in them and attain a thirst for human blood and that the only way to put an end to the curse it to kill the entire bloodline of werewolves. Lars then visits the hospital and discovers Eilert is infected by the beast, so he shuts down the equipment keeping him alive before leaving. Thale awakens in a shed near her home and realises what she has done, she decides to run away to Oslo on a night bus. While on the bus, the full moon breaks through the clouds and transforms Thale in a full wolf just as the bus enters a tunnel. Thale attacks the other passengers on the bus, which ends up crashing in the tunnel. Liv arrives first on the scene and stumbles upon the survivors from the bus crash, who tell her a wolf attacked them. When Liv reaches the bus, the wolf has already left, leaving behind the carnage. During her search, Liv stumbles upon her daughter's torn up clothes and jewellery. At the same time William arrives at the scene, informing Liv that after testing the wolf body, he had found that it contained human DNA, confirming they were dealing with an actual werewolf. This convinces Liv that her daughter was now become the new werewolf.

Thale in her fully transformed form, returns home and approaches her deaf sister Jenny, lunging at her just as Jenny notices her presence. However the two recognize each other, mainly due to Thale's heterochromia, calming Thale down. Their stepfather Arthur stumbles upon the scene and fights Thale of with a lamp before taking Jenny with him in his van and racing off to the city centre, with Thale in pursuit. Arthur however is bleeding heavily from a wound he sustained and passes out behind the wheel, causing them to crash on a bridge near a crowded pub. He signs to Jenny to run just as the crowd approach the crashed van to help the pair, and just as Thale arrives. Thale goes on a murder spree and attacks multiple people near the pub before Liv and William arrive. Jenny tries to calm her sister down which initially seems to work before William shoots Thale with a tranquilizer dart. Liv grabs Jenny and the three run into an empty store which is under construction. As they struggle to keep Thale out, Liv orders Jenny to hide behind the counter. At that point, Lars arrives in his RV and smashes through the store front in an attempt to hit Thale. Liv, William and Lars are all injured following the crash and an unharmed Thale enters the store, killing Lars and attacking Liv. Liv holds Thale off by using her wrist cast to protect her arm as Thale bites down on it and orders an injured William to shoot Thale again with a tranquilizer dart. Seeing William is unable to fullfill the request, Jenny takes the dart and stabs it into her sister's side, putting an end to the attack.

Thale is kept in the vet clinic while still unconscious. Liv visits her and loads a silver bullet into her gun, placing it against Thale's neck as she loses her composure and looks away. The movie ends with Liv arriving home and placing the silver bullet next to a picture of Thale on her nightstand.

Cast 
 Liv Mjönes as Liv Berg
 Elli Rhiannon Müller Osborne as Thale Berg
 Arthur Hakalahti as William Nordvaag
 Vidar Magnussen as Arthur Berg
 Mia Fosshaug Laubacher as Jenny Berg
 Sjur Vatne Brean as Jonas Larson
 Ståle Bjørnhaug as Lars Brodin
 Øyvind Brandtzæg as Eilert Sundas
 Silje Øksland Krohne as Elin Gran
 Anna Drowak as Tove Gran
 Kasper Antonsen as Vidar Uthaug
 Ívar Örn Sverrisson as Olav
 Sverre Breivik as Torgersen
 Jon Stensby as Harald
 Pål Anders Nordvi as Journalist (uncredited)

Reception 
The film received mixed reviews, scoring 50% on rotten tomatoes based on 6 reviews. It raked in $57,727 at the box office and was released on Netflix on 3 February 2023.

References

External links 
 
 

Norwegian thriller films
Norwegian horror films
Norwegian horror thriller films
Werewolf films
2020s Norwegian-language films
Films set in Norway
Films set in 2022
Films set in the 2020s
Films set in the 21st century
Films shot in Norway
2020s horror thriller films
2020s horror films
2020s thriller films